Charles Joseph Mahaney, commonly known as C.J., is an American Christian minister. He is the senior pastor at Sovereign Grace Church of Louisville, and was formerly president of Sovereign Grace Ministries, now known as Sovereign Grace Churches (formerly People of Destiny International or PDI, co-founded with Larry Tomczak), a network formed to establish and support local churches. He was one of the founding pastors and leaders of Covenant Life Church, in Gaithersburg, Maryland. Under Mahaney's leadership, Sovereign Grace Church of Louisville is a member of Sovereign Grace Churches and works with the Southern Baptist Convention for training and Christian mission work.

Mahaney resigned from the presidency of Sovereign Grace Ministries in 2013 in order to plant Sovereign Grace Church of Louisville. A 2012 class-action suit was filed against Sovereign Grace Ministries and listed Mahaney as a defendant. The lawsuit was dismissed due to the statute of limitations; Mahaney released a public statement explicitly denying all claims in the suit.

Biography

Early life and career
Mahaney was born in Maryland into a Roman Catholic household, the middle child of five. He was the son of a metalworker in Takoma Park, Maryland. As a child, he was more interested in sports than God. Mahaney attended Springbrook High School in Silver Spring, Maryland. He reports having been converted in 1972 at age 18 by a friend who shared his faith. He says that a newspaper ad motivated him to join a local prayer meeting known as Take and Give, which evolved into Covenant Life Church.

In 1974, aged 20, Mahaney had met Larry Tomczak, with whom he led and taught a large local prayer group. He says his only reading in theology at that time had consisted of the Bible and The Late, Great Planet Earth by Hal Lindsey.

In 1977, Mahaney became senior pastor of what had evolved into Covenant Life Church. He cites his reading of the works of 19th century Baptist leader Charles H. Spurgeon and the Reformed theology of John Calvin as influences.

Mahaney met Carolyn Layman in the 1970s, while he was teaching at Take and Give and she was working as a secretary at a Christian conference ministry in Sarasota, and they soon married. Mahaney has one son and three daughters.

Since 2000
Mahaney was the senior pastor of Covenant Life Church in Gaithersburg, Maryland for 27 years before handing the senior pastor role to Joshua Harris on September 18, 2004. In 2012 he planted a church on the east side of Louisville, Kentucky.

Voluntarily leave of absence, SGM

In June 2011 Mahaney voluntarily took a leave of absence for self-examination after charges were leveled against him by a former Sovereign Grace pastor. His leave occurred in the wake of accusations from a former top Sovereign Grace pastor who distributed hundreds of e-mails and internal church documents that portrayed Mahaney as focusing on the sins of others below him in the church hierarchy. After Mahaney's departure, the Sovereign Grace board gave a strong vote of confidence to him, saying that he is "a qualified minister of the gospel and this board approves his pastoral and teaching ministry." After an extensive outside review by Ambassadors of Reconciliation of the charges brought against him and affirmation of the Sovereign Grace board, Mahaney continued to serve as president of Sovereign Grace Ministries. Covenant Life Church, the church Mahaney co-founded and pastored for 27 years left Sovereign Grace Ministries.

Class action lawsuit and aftermath

In 2012, a class action lawsuit was filed against Sovereign Grace Ministries alleging that leaders including Mahaney covered up child sexual abuse. The lawsuit was dismissed with prejudice in May 2013. The Maryland Court of Appeals also dismissed the case after finding that the Plaintiff's lawyer had filed the appeal too early. Since the case was dismissed, a former volunteer at CLC, Nathaniel Morales, 56, was convicted of sexually abusing three young boys between 1983 and 1991. During the trial, Mahaney's brother-in-law, former pastor Grant Layman, admitted that he did not report sex abuse claims to authorities but tried to handle it within the church.

Mahaney co-hosted the Together for the Gospel conference with Mark Dever, Ligon Duncan and Albert Mohler. It was announced that he was pulling out of the 2014 T4G due to ongoing lawsuits against Sovereign Grace Ministries. He returned in 2016 but withdrew again in 2018.

In February 2016, Mahaney was the subject of a Washingtonian magazine article, titled The Sex Scandal That Devastated a Suburban Megachurch - Inside the Rise and Fall of Sovereign Grace.

Sovereign Grace Church of Louisville

Mahaney is the senior pastor of Sovereign Grace Church of Louisville, a church he planted in the fall of 2012 with Bob Kauflin, Brian Chesemore, Jeff Purswell, and Gary Ricucci. He resigned from the presidency of Sovereign Grace Ministries in April 2013 while planting the church.

Selected publications
 Don't Waste Your Sports, Crossway Publishing 2010, 
 Living the Cross Centered Life, Multnomah Books 2006, 
 Humility: True Greatness Multnomah Books 2005, 
 Sex, Romance, and the Glory of God, Crossway Publishing 2004, 
 Worldliness: Resisting the Seduction of a Fallen World, Crossway Publishing 2010, 
 Christ Our Mediator, Multnomah Books 2006, 
 The Cross Centered Life, Multnomah Books 2002, 
 Why Small Groups?, Sovereign Grace Ministries 1996, 
 Disciplines for Life, People of Destiny International 1994,

References

Further reading
 Clap Your Hands! by Larry Tomczak includes stories from Mahaney's early days in ministry and details the origins of Covenant Life Church and Sovereign Grace Ministries

External links
 Sovereign Grace Church of Louisville official site

1953 births
Living people
American religious leaders
American Christian clergy
American Charismatics
Apostolic networks
People from Takoma Park, Maryland
Religious leaders from Louisville, Kentucky
Converts to evangelical Christianity from Roman Catholicism